Barrio Balboa is one of the 18 corregimientos of La Chorrera District. The population is of 29,589 peoples, and its representative is Tomás Velásquez Correa.

References 

Populated places in Panamá Province